Lungelo Payi (born 22 May 1981) is a former South African rugby union player who played with the .

In 2009, he was playing club rugby with False Bay Rugby Club when he got a surprise call-up to the Southern Kings squad for their game against the British and Irish Lions. In 2010, he moved back to the Eastern Cape region and joined  for the 2010 Currie Cup First Division season. He is currently a sports commentator and runs a number of youth rugby development programmes and manages a number of professional players through his sports management company.

References

South African rugby union players
Living people
1981 births
Border Bulldogs players
Western Province (rugby union) players
Falcons (rugby union) players
Eastern Province Elephants players
Boland Cavaliers players
Rugby union locks
Rugby union players from the Eastern Cape